Eastern Rite or Eastern liturgical rite may refer to:

 liturgical rite used in Eastern Christianity:
 liturgical rites of the Eastern Orthodox Church, which mainly use the Byzantine liturgical rites
 liturgical rites of the Eastern Catholic Churches, which use various liturgical rites of Eastern Christian tradition
 the Eastern Syriac Rite, an eastern variant of Syriac Rite, used by several different churches

See also
 Western Rite (disambiguation)